Miles is a city in Runnels County, Texas, United States. The population was 829 at the 2010 census.

The city was named after Johnathan Miles, who donated $5,000 to a fund for an extension of a railroad track.

Geography

Miles is located at  (31.598991, –100.182564).

Demographics

2020 census

As of the 2020 United States census, there were 875 people, 337 households, and 241 families residing in the city.

2000 census
As of the census of 2000, 850 people, 309 households, and 237 families resided in the city. The population density was 636.2 people per square mile (244.9/km2). There were 361 housing units at an average density of 270.2 per square mile (104.0/km). The racial makeup of the city was 78.00% White, 0.12% African American, 0.12% Asian, 19.88% from other races, and 1.88% from two or more races. Hispanics or Latinos of any race were 37.29% of the population.

Of the 309 households, 34.3% had children under the age of 18 living with them, 64.4% were married couples living together, 10.0% had a female householder with no husband present, and 23.3% were not families. About 22.0% of all households were made up of individuals, and 14.2% had someone living alone who was 65 years of age or older. The average household size was 2.75 and the average family size was 3.23.

In the city, the population was distributed as 28.4% under the age of 18, 7.3% from 18 to 24, 27.3% from 25 to 44, 21.1% from 45 to 64, and 16.0% who were 65 years of age or older. The median age was 36 years. For every 100 females, there were 93.2 males. For every 100 females age 18 and over, there were 92.1 males.

The median income for a household in the city was $30,461, and for a family was $34,000. Males had a median income of $25,000 versus $20,789 for females. The per capita income for the city was $15,148. About 15.2% of families and 17.4% of the population were below the poverty line, including 19.8% of those under age 18 and 25.4% of those age 65 or over.

Education
The city is served by the Miles Independent School District.

References

Cities in Texas
Cities in Runnels County, Texas